Devlali railway station is a railway station serving Devlali town, near Nashik in Maharashtra State of India. It is under Bhusawal railway division of Central Railway zone of Indian Railways.

It is located at 560 m above sea level and has three platforms. As of 2016, an electrified double  broad gauge railway line exists. At this station, 46 trains stop, one train originates and one train terminates. Ozar Airport, near Nashik, is at distance of 27 kilometers.

References

Bhusawal railway division
Railway stations in Nashik district
Transport in Nashik